Borge is a parish and former municipality in Nordland county, Norway.  The  municipality existed from 1838 until 1963.  It was located on the northern part of the island of Vestvågøya in what is now Vestvågøy Municipality.  The administrative centre of the municipality was the village of Bøstad where Borge Church is located.

History
The prestegjeld of Borge was established as a municipality on 1 January 1838 (see formannskapsdistrikt). In 1927, the southern district of Borge (population: 625) split off to form the new municipality of Valdberg.  This left Borge with 4,093 inhabitants. During the 1960s, there were many municipal mergers across Norway due to the work of the Schei Committee.  On 1 January 1963, the municipality of Borge (population: 4,056) was merged with the neighboring municipalities of Buksnes (population: 4,416), Hol (population: 3,154), and Valberg (population: 662) to create the new Vestvågøy Municipality.

Name
The municipality (originally the parish) is named after the old Borge farm since the first Borge Church was built there. The name is the plural form of borg which means "castle" or "hill/plateau suitable for a castle".

Government
While it existed, this municipality was responsible for primary education (through 10th grade), outpatient health services, senior citizen services, unemployment, social services, zoning, economic development, and municipal roads. During its existence, this municipality was governed by a municipal council of elected representatives, which in turn elected a mayor.

Municipal council
The municipal council  of Borge was made up of 17 representatives that were elected to four year terms.  The party breakdown of the final municipal council was as follows:

See also
List of former municipalities of Norway

References

Vestvågøy
Former municipalities of Norway
1838 establishments in Norway
1963 disestablishments in Norway